Morris Huberland (1909–2003) was a Polish-American photographer. Huberland is best known for his black and white documentary photography of New York City street scenes.

Early life
Huberland was born in Warsaw, Congress Poland in 1909. His family moved the United States in 1920, where Huberland would grow up in the Jewish Ghetto of the Lower East Side. He began taking photos at the age of sixteen. In 1940, he joined the New York Photo League. He joined the US Army in 1943, eventually becoming a corporal.

Collections
Huberland's work is included in the collections of:
the Art Institute of Chicago 
the Columbus Museum of Art
the Jewish Museum, New York  
the Los Angeles County Museum of Art 
the Metropolitan Museum of Art
the Museum of Fine Arts Houston
the National Gallery of Canada
the Smithsonian Museum of American Art 
the New-York Historical Society Museum and Library 
the Samuel Dorsky Museum of Art
the San Francisco Museum of Modern Art 
the Smart Museum of Art
the New York Public Library

References

20th-century American photographers
1909 births
2003 deaths
Photographers from New York City
Polish emigrants to the United States